Superciliaspis is an extinct genus of jawless fish which existed in what is now the Northwest Territories of Canada during the Lochkovian age. Originally identified as a species of Cephalaspis (C. gabrielsi) by Dineley and Loeffler in 1976, it was reassigned to Superciliaspis gabrielsi by Adrain and Wilson in 1994.

References

Osteostraci genera
Fossils of British Columbia
Fish enigmatic taxa
Devonian jawless fish
Fossil taxa described in 1994